School of Hard Knocks is a 1989 role-playing game adventure for GURPS published by Steve Jackson Games.

Plot summary
School of Hard Knocks is an adventure in which a group of super-powered kids are causing trouble in town and the superhero player characters must stop them.

Publication history
School of Hard Knocks was written by Aaron Allston, with a cover by David Dorman, and illustrations by Doug Shuler, and was published by Steve Jackson Games in 1989 as a 32-page book.

Reception
Mike Jarvis reviewed School of Hard Knocks for Games International magazine, and gave it 3 stars out of 5, and stated that "I feel this could prove a little tricky for a beginner to handle. On the whole a reasonable effort, but be prepared for a little hard work."

Reviews
Games Unplugged #3	(Oct./Nov., 2000)

References

GURPS books
Role-playing game adventures
Role-playing game supplements introduced in 1989